Kanti Baa (born 15 November 1979) is a member of the Indian women's hockey team and played with the team when it won the Gold at the 2002 Commonwealth Games.

Early life 
Kaanti Baa was born on 15 November 1979 in Simdega district, Jharkhand. She attended school at Bariyatu Government Girls High.

Career 
She works for the Central Railway in Mumbai.

In her hockey career, she has competed in both domestic and international circuits. She made her first appearance at Australia 4 Nation Tournament in 1999. The most recent game played by Kanti was the Commonwealth in 2002.

References

External links
Biography
Commonwealth Games Biography

1979 births
Indian female field hockey players
People from Simdega district
Field hockey players from Jharkhand
Living people
Field hockey players at the 2002 Commonwealth Games
Field hockey players at the 2006 Commonwealth Games
Commonwealth Games gold medallists for India
Commonwealth Games silver medallists for India
Field hockey players at the 2002 Asian Games
Sportswomen from Jharkhand
Commonwealth Games medallists in field hockey
21st-century Indian women
21st-century Indian people
Asian Games competitors for India
Medallists at the 2002 Commonwealth Games
Medallists at the 2006 Commonwealth Games